Bennewitz is a German surname. Notable people with the surname include:

 Antonín Bennewitz (1833–1926), Czech violinist, conductor and music teacher
 Diederik Lodewijk Bennewitz (1764–1826), Dutch goldsmith, silversmith and jeweller
 Fritz Bennewitz (1926–1995), German theatre director
 Peter Bennewitz (1495–1552), birth name of Petrus Apianus, German humanist
 Philipp Bennewitz (1531–1589), birth name of Philipp Apian, German mathematician, doctor, cartographer
 Paul Bennewitz (1927–2003), an American businessman
 Rick Bennewitz (1936–1999), an American television soap opera director

German-language surnames